The VIP RAF Voyager, also known as the "Vespina" (its Royal Air Force designation) and with a military registration of ZZ336, refers to a customised Airbus A330 MRTT owned and operated by the Royal Air Force that is the first principal VIP transport plane for British government ministers and the British royal family. While the RAF operates a fleet of Voyagers, the VIP RAF Voyager refers specifically to one painted in a United Kingdom livery and fitted with business class seats and media facilities, similar to other dedicated air transports of heads of state and government. 

Proposals to provide a new dedicated VIP transport aircraft, for governmental or royal use, were first mooted in 1998 under Prime Minister Tony Blair; the proposed aircraft was nicknamed "Blair Force One" (a joking reference to Air Force One).  In March 2009 a proposal for a £7 million 12-seater private jet plans were halted by recession. It was not until the end of 2015 that the British Government announced that one VIP RAF Voyager will be converted from a normal RAF Voyager. This was completed in 2016 at a cost of £10 million, with then-Prime Minister David Cameron taking the plane ("Cam Force One") to the 2016 Warsaw summit. In June 2020, Prime Minister Boris Johnson ordered that the plane be painted in a United Kingdom-themed red, white, and blue livery, earning it the nickname "Boris Force One". Johnson projected that the entire rebrand would cost about £900,000. 

Despite having been fitted as a VIP aircraft since 2016, and having a custom livery since 2020, the British Government and the RAF has insisted that the plane will continue to serve its military purpose of mid-air refueling and personnel transport.

See also 

 Air transports of heads of state and government
 Air transport of the British royal family and government

References 

Air transport of heads of state
Royal vehicles